Lawrence Elliott Willis (December 20, 1942 – September 29, 2019) was an American jazz pianist and composer. He performed in a wide range of styles, including jazz fusion, Afro-Cuban jazz, bebop, and avant-garde.

Willis was born in New York City. After his first year studying music theory at the Manhattan School of Music he began performing regularly with Jackie McLean. After he graduated he made his first jazz recording, McLean's Right Now! in January 1965, which featured two of Willis' compositions. His first recording of any type, however, was as a singer with the Music and Arts Chorale Ensemble, performing an opera by Aaron Copland under the direction of Leonard Bernstein. He decided to concentrate on jazz because of the difficulties African-American musicians had in finding work in concert music.

Throughout his career he performed with a wide range of musicians, including several years as keyboardist for Blood, Sweat & Tears (beginning in 1972). He spent several years as pianist for trumpeters Nat Adderley and Woody Shaw as well as long and productive tenures with Roy Hargrove and with Jerry Gonzalez and his Fort Apache Band. His late recording with Paul Murphy, Exposé, demonstrated the fusion principles of bebop and avant-garde jazz. His composition "Sanctuary" began exploring works employing strings. After a successful performance in Frank Lloyd Wright's Annie Pfieffer Chapel at Florida Southern College's Child of the Sun Jazz Festival he was commissioned to write a full-scale orchestral work for jazz trio and orchestra. He worked with Hugh Masekela on a South African Suite of music and interpreted Miles Davis' work. He was in the Round About Midnight tour of Miles Davis' music. He received the Don Redman award in 2011, and the Benny Golson Jazz Master Award at Howard University in 2012.

He died of an aneurysm in Baltimore at the age of 76.

Discography

As leader/co-leader
 A New Kind of Soul (LLP, 1970)
 Inner Crisis (Groove Merchant, 1973)
 My Funny Valentine (Jazz City, 1988)
 Just in Time (SteepleChase, 1989)
 Heavy Blue (SteepleChase, 1990)
 Let's Play (SteepleChase, 1991)
 Steal Away (AudioQuest, 1991 1992)
 Solo Spirit (Mapleshade, 1992, [1993])
 How Do You Keep the Music Playing? (SteepleChase, 1992)
 Unforgettable: Piano Solos, (SteepleChase, 1992)
 A Tribute to Someone (AudioQuest, 1993 [1994])
 Serenade (Sound Hills, 1995)
 If Trees Could Talk (Mapleshade, 1999) with Hamiet Bluiett
 Sunshower (Mapleshade, 2001) with Kash Killion, Steve Novosel, Paul Murphy, Steve Berrios
 Sanctuary (Mapleshade, 2003)  with Joe Ford, Ray Codrington, Steve Novosel, Steve Berrios, Artie Sherman and the Rick Schmidt Strings
 The Powers of Two (Mapleshade, 2004) with Paul Murphy
 Alter Ego (Mapleshade, 2006) with Tony Pancella
 The Big Push (HighNote, 2006)
 Blue Fable (HighNote, 2007)
 The Offering (HighNote, 2008)
 This Time the Dream's on Me (HighNote, 2012)

As sideman
With Nat Adderley
 On the Move (Theresa, 1983)
Blue Autumn (Theresa, 1983)
With Gary Bartz
Episode One: Children of Harlem (Challenge, 1994)
With Cindy Blackman
Arcane (Muse, 1987)
With Carla Bley
Night-Glo (Watt/ECM, 1985)
Sextet (Watt/ECM, 1987)
With Blood, Sweat & Tears
New Blood (Columbia, 1972)
No Sweat (Columbia, 1973)
Mirror Image (Columbia, 1974)
New City (Columbia, 1975)
In Concert (Columbia, 1976)
More Than Ever (Columbia, 1976)
Brand New Day (ABC Records, 1977)
With Jerry Gonzalez and The Fort Apache Band
 Earth Dance (Sunnyside, 1993)  
 Crossroads (Milestone, 1994) 
 Pensativo (Milestone, 1995) 
 Fire Dance (Milestone, 1996) 
With Roy Hargrove 
 Moment to Moment (Verve, 2000)
With Louis Hayes
Nightfall (SteepleChase, 1991)
With Jimmy Heath
Peer Pleasure (Landmark, 1987)
With Joe Henderson
Multiple (Milestone, 1973)
With Groove Holmes
American Pie (Groove Merchant, 1972)
With Clifford Jordan
The Mellow Side of Clifford Jordan (Mapleshade, 1989-91 [1997])
With Robin Kenyatta 
Gypsy Man (Atlantic, 1973)
With Hugh Masekela
Grrr (uncredited) (1966)
Reconstruction (1970)
Home Is Where the Music Is (1978)
Main Event Live (1978)
Almost Like Being in Jazz (2005)
Friends (2012)
With Jackie McLean
Right Now! (Blue Note, 1965)
Jacknife (Blue Note, 1965)
With Carmen McRae
Carmen Sings Monk (1988)
With Lee Morgan
Infinity (Blue Note, 1965)
With Alphonse Mouzon
The Essence of Mystery (Blue Note, 1972)
With Paul Murphy
 The Powers of Two, Volume 2 (Mapleshade, 2004 [2006])
 Exposé (Murphy Records, 2008)
 Excursions (Murphy Records, 2008)
 Foundations (Murphy Records, 2009)
With David "Fathead" Newman
Still Hard Times (Muse, 1982)
With Valery Ponomarev
Trip to Moscow (Reservoir, 1987)
With Woody Shaw
For Sure! (Columbia, 1979)
With Steve Swallow
Carla (Xtra Watt, 1987)
With Buddy Terry
Lean on Him (Mainstream, 1973)
With Norris Turney
Big, Sweet 'n Blue – with Turney, Walter Booker, and Jimmy Cobb (Mapleshade, 1993)
'With  Fred LipsiusDreaming of Your Love (mja Records,1995)
With C. I. Williams
When Alto Was King (Mapleshade, 1997)

As co-leader
With Heads of State
Search for Peace – with Buster Williams, Al Foster, and Gary Bartz (Smoke Sessions, 2015)

References

External links

1942 births
2019 deaths
Musicians from New York City
Fiorello H. LaGuardia High School alumni
Jazz fusion pianists
Post-bop pianists
American jazz pianists
American male pianists
Manhattan School of Music alumni
Bebop pianists
Avant-garde jazz pianists
Blood, Sweat & Tears members
20th-century American pianists
Jazz musicians from New York (state)
21st-century American pianists
20th-century American male musicians
21st-century American male musicians
American male jazz musicians
Mapleshade Records artists
HighNote Records artists